Antoine de La Garanderie (22 March 1920 – 27 June 2010) was a French educator and philosopher.

Honours 

 1970, Montyon Prize: La Valeur de l'ennui

Bibliography 
 Charles Gardou (dir.), La gestion mentale en questions. À propos des travaux d'Antoine de La Garanderie. Ramonville Saint-Agne, Éditions Érès, 1995.
 Jean-Pierre Gaté
 Éduquer au sens de l'écrit. Paris, Éditions Nathan, 1998.
 T. Payen de la Garanderie (collaboration), Introduction à Antoine de La Garanderie. Naissance d'un pédagogue. Lyon, Chroniques sociales, 2007.
 A. Géninet, M. Giroul, T. Payen de La Garanderie (collaboration), Vocabulaire de la gestion mentale. Lyon, Chroniques sociales, 2009.
 La pensée d'Antoine de La Garanderie (dir.) : Lecture plurielle  Postface de Renaud Hétier, Lyon, Chronique sociale, 2013

1920 births
2010 deaths
French educators
French psychologists
Montyon Prize laureates